"Two Hands" is a song written and performed by Jars of Clay. It is the first radio single from their 2009 studio album, The Long Fall Back to Earth. A remix of the song was available in the iTunes limited edition version of the album.

Music video 
The music video for "Two Hands" features video footage from the band's trip to Kenya mixed with video of the band performing the song first in a library/office, then later in a high-rise building. Touring band members Gabe Ruschival and Jeremy Lutito appear with the band in the video.

Other appearances
The song also makes an appearance on WOW Hits 2010.

Charts
Hot Christian Songs: No. 6

Awards

In 2010, the song was nominated for a Dove Award for Song of the Year at the 41st GMA Dove Awards.

References

2009 singles
Jars of Clay songs
2009 songs
Essential Records (Christian) singles
Songs written by Matt Odmark
Songs written by Dan Haseltine
Songs written by Charlie Lowell
Songs written by Stephen Mason (musician)